Roxana Gabriela Cogianu (born 21 September 1986 in Iași) is a Romanian rower. Competing in the women's coxed eight she finished 4th in the eight at the 2012 Summer Olympics, having finished in 9th in the women's double sculls at the 2008 Summer Olympics.

References

External links
 
 
 
 

1986 births
Living people
Romanian female rowers
Rowers at the 2008 Summer Olympics
Rowers at the 2012 Summer Olympics
Rowers at the 2016 Summer Olympics
Olympic rowers of Romania
World Rowing Championships medalists for Romania
Olympic bronze medalists for Romania
Medalists at the 2016 Summer Olympics
Olympic medalists in rowing
European Rowing Championships medalists
Sportspeople from Iași